The Three Wise Guys is a 1936 American drama film directed by George B. Seitz, written by Elmer Harris and Damon Runyon, and starring Robert Young, Betty Furness, Raymond Walburn, Thurston Hall, Bruce Cabot and Donald Meek. It was released on May 15, 1936, by Metro-Goldwyn-Mayer.

Plot

Cast 
Robert Young as Joe Hatcher
Betty Furness as Clarabelle Brooks
Raymond Walburn as Doc Brown
Thurston Hall as Hatcher
Bruce Cabot as Blackie
Donald Meek as Gribbie
Herman Bing as Baumgarten
Harvey Stephens as Ambersham
Harry Tyler as Yegg
Pat West as Bartender
Guy Edward Hearn as Cop
Alex Melesh as Waiter

References

External links 
 

1936 films
American drama films
1936 drama films
Metro-Goldwyn-Mayer films
Films directed by George B. Seitz
Films produced by Harry Rapf
American black-and-white films
1930s English-language films
1930s American films